Palmira may refer to:

Places
Palmira, Mendoza, a town in San Martín Department, Mendoza, Argentina
Santos Dumont, Minas Gerais, formerly named Palmira, a city and a municipality in Brazil
Palmira, Valle del Cauca, a city and a municipality in Colombia
Palmira, a village in Hojancha District, Costa Rica
Palmira, Cuba
Palmira, Chiriquí, Panama
Palmira, Colón, Panama
Palmira, Los Santos, Panama
Palmira, Táchira, a town in Venezuela

Other uses
Palmira, regina di Persia, an opera
FC Palmira Odesa, Ukrainian association football club
MV Ocean Life or Palmira, a cruise ship

People
 Palmira (name)

See also
Nueva Palmira a city in Colonia, Uruguay
Palmyra (disambiguation)